Zhujiang Road Station may refer to:
Zhujiang Road station (Nanjing)
Zhujiang Road station (Chengdu)
Zhujiang Road station (Guiyang)
Zhujiang Road station (Nanchang)